Sara Blackwell is an American attorney specializing in employment law and is the founder of Protect US Workers, a non profit organization. Blackwell gained national media attention when she represented hundreds of United States citizens and permanent residents who were replaced by recipients of H-1B temporary work visas. In 2018, she represented New Orleans Saints cheerleader, Bailey Davis, who was fired for an Instagram post and allegedly attending a party where NFL players were present.

Background 
Blackwell earned a B.S. in Criminal Justice from McNeese State University (1999) and her J.D. from Louisiana State University, Paul M. Hebert Law Center (2002). She currently (April 2018) teaches Employment Law at the University of South Florida.  Her public sector experience includes working for a judge as a federal court law clerk and she served as an attorney for the Western District of Louisiana. In the private sector, she has worked for several firms as an employment attorney. She is currently the president of The Blackwell Firm.

High profile cases

H-1B visa foreign worker replacement 
In 2016, Blackwell represented former Information Technology (IT) personnel of Walt Disney Corporation, in Perrero v. HCL America, Inc. et al. In dismissing the case, Judge Gregory A. Presnell exposed a loophole in the displacement protections afforded United States workers. In the 1998 amendment, a class of exempt H-1B workers was created with the minimum criterion of either a master's degree or a $60,000 salary. The exemption is only available to H-1B Dependent firms who employ 15% or more of their personnel on H-1B (or L-1) visas. The Atlantic reports that these firms, primarily specializing in outsourcing, are free to replace older or more expensive employees with temporary foreign workers.

Undeterred with the dismissal in Perrero v. HCL America, Inc. et al., Blackwell provided representation and organizational expertise in several similar H-1B cases: 49 career IT personnel at the University of California, Davis, forced to train their replacements, resulting in a workforce reduction of 97 personnel, 400 IT personnel trained their replacements at Southern California Edison, 200 similarly dismissed IT personnel from Carnival Cruise Line, and in its 220 personnel separation, Eversource Energy labeled the training of replacements as "knowledge transfer".

Blackwell has appeared on 60 Minutes, and spoke at Trump presidential campaign rallies, but she voiced frustration with the administration's progress in addressing the flawed temporary foreign worker programs in March 2017.

NFL cheerleaders differential treatment 
In March 2018, the New York Times printed the story of a former New Orleans Saints cheerleader's E.E.O.C. filing concerning the team's employment policies. The New York Times learned from Bailey Davis' interviews, emails and an eight-page handbook that unlike the rule for NFL players, the team has an anti-fraternization policy where cheerleaders must leave public accommodations if a player enters the room, may not speak to and must block NFL players on social media, may not be photographed in uniform and may not appear nude or in revealing attire.  Davis was fired for appearing on her private Instagram in a one piece bathing suit.

Blackwell orchestrated a series of television interviews which gained wide exposure in the United States and with some international publishers. In April, former Miami Dolphins cheerleader, Kristan Ann Ware, joined with Davis as an additional plaintiff concerning an incident related to her religion, the team admits to the incident and that it reprimanded the supervisory employee; however, that employee is still with the team.

As of April 29, 2018, the plaintiffs are seeking arbitration with the NFL and one dollar in compensation. Prior to the Bailey Davis E.E.O.C. filing, Time magazine reported that NFL cheerleaders are paid about $10.00 per hour, and these salaries are often capped. An earlier lawsuit claimed with additional commitments and expenses, a San Francisco 49ers cheerleader earned about $2.75 per hour.

Publications 
Blackwell has contributed to the Jambalaya News, the Times Southwest and the City Social of Baton Rouge.

Books 
 Destiny Of One, Sara Blackwell, The Peppertree Press, December 3, 2014, 
 Venergy, Sara Blackwell and Emily Gerety, Pants On Fire Press, Mar 16, 2017,

References

External links 
 
 Protect US Workers

Workers' rights activists
American civil rights lawyers
Immigration lawyers
21st-century American lawyers
McNeese State University alumni
Louisiana State University Law Center alumni
Women nonprofit executives
Living people
Year of birth missing (living people)
21st-century American women lawyers